Nightline was an Australian late-night news bulletin television program produced by Nine News for Nine Network. Introduced in 1985 as a 5-minute late-night news summary before becoming a 30-minute bulletin in 1992, it was cancelled in 2008, then was brought back in 2009 before it was cancelled again in July 2010. Nightline was previously presented by Kellie Sloane.

The series was patterned after the version that airs on ABC (US), but that one is different from the Australian counterpart even though at one point both versions used the same opening graphics, which both no longer use.

History
In 2007, Nightline was also broadcast at 10:30pm on Nine HD, an hour before it was broadcast on Nine SD. This only lasted for a short period of time, however.

Nightline was axed on Friday 25 July 2008 due to budget constraints as part of Nine's news and current affairs division. Wendy Kingston presented the final edition.

In May 2009 during the major expansion to the Nine News brand, Nine's Late News bulletin was re-introduced into the 11:30pm time slot left vacant by Nightline. Nine's Late News, presented by Wendy Kingston, was first broadcast on Monday 4 May 2009.

In November 2009, Nine's Late News was re-launched as Nightline. However, after declining audience numbers due to increasing sporting commitments with televising Friday night NRL (in the northern states) and Wimbledon in June 2010, the Nine Network permanently retired Nightline. It was replaced with sporting telecasts and more "youth" programming that is borrowed from sister networks GO! and GEM, including the continuing of national-produced comprehensive half-hourly news updates presented by reporters who are on shift and is produced from the Willoughby news studios, if reporters are from Melbourne, Brisbane, Adelaide or Perth must travel to Sydney to present the news updates. Nine offered Kellie Sloane a redundancy package.

Presenters
At the time of Nightline's 2010 axing, the presenters were:
 News: Kellie Sloane
 Weather: Jaynie Seal (Fridays)

At the time of Nightline's 2008 axing, the presenters were:
 News: Michael Usher (Monday to Thursday) and Allison Langdon (Friday)
 Sport: Stephanie Brantz
 Weather: Jaynie Seal and Mike Bailey

The past presenters of Nightline are:
 1992–2001: Jim Waley – former Sky News Australia presenter, now retired
 2001–2004: Hugh Riminton – now with 10 News First 
 2004–2005: Helen Kapalos – now a freelance journalist, and currently the Chairperson of the Victorian Multicultural Commission
 2005–2006: Ellen Fanning – now no longer with the Nine Network, but still a part-time reporter with 60 Minutes and main presenter for The Drum on the ABC
 2006–2008: Michael Usher – now the presenter of The Latest: Seven News on Mondays to Thursdays, as well as the Friday and Saturday co-presenter of Seven News Sydney
 2009: Wendy Kingston – as Nine Late News – now no longer with the Nine Network
 2009–2010: Kellie Sloane – now a Media Commentator

Other past fill-in presenters of Nightline included:
 Georgie Gardner – now the Friday and Saturday anchor of Nine News Sydney
 Jennifer Keyte – now 10 News First Melbourne weeknight presenter
 Helen Dalley – now presenter on Sky News Australia presenting Sunday Business and Sunday Agenda
 Leila McKinnon – now reporter and fill in presenter for Nine News and A Current Affair
 Peter Overton – now Nine News Sydney Sunday-Thursday presenter
 Ian Ross – deceased, former Seven News Sydney presenter
 Kim Watkins – former co-host of Network Ten's morning show 9am with David and Kim
 Mark Ferguson – now the Sunday – Thursday presenter on Seven News Sydney
 Sharyn Ghidella – now the weeknight co-presenter of Seven News Brisbane
 Allison Langdon – now the presenter of A Current Affair

Format
Nightline consists of news, sport, finance and weather. Reports were sourced mainly from Nine News reports nationwide, but the bulletin sometimes also includes reports from A Current Affair, 60 Minutes and international news services.

Presentation
When Nightline returned in 2009, it was presented from the Today set. However, only one camera angle was used, being the plasma screen showing a live night-time shot of the Sydney skyline. The program was presented from TCN9's "Studio 3". The backdrop is now of the Nine newsroom. The set is also used for the Early, Morning, Afternoon News bulletins.

In 2006–2008, Nightline'''s opening sequence used the same generic city buildings of the National Nine News opener, except that they were shown at night instead. Nightline also used its own arrangement of the National Nine News'' theme.

See also
 List of Australian television series

References

1992 Australian television series debuts
2008 Australian television series endings
2009 Australian television series debuts
2010 Australian television series endings
Australian television news shows
English-language television shows
Nine Network original programming